Robert Thomas Sanderson (1912–1989) was an American inorganic chemist, more commonly known by the initials "R.T." found in his papers. He received his Ph.D. degree from the University of Chicago for his research in boron chemistry. After working in Texaco's research lab, he became a professor and spent his career on the faculties of the University of Florida, the University of Iowa, and Arizona State University. He also created a company supplying safety posters and lab-related artwork of his own design, and published several books including Vacuum Manipulation of Volatile Compounds.

Electronegativity equalization 

In 1951, Sanderson developed the idea of electronegativity equalization, stating two bonding atoms will equalize their Mulliken electronegativity. He would later further revise his own scale of electronegativity to adhere to the 4.00 value of fluorine found in the more common Pauling scale, as well as apply his principle to the calculation of  polar covalent bonds, calculating partial charges on a number of polar inorganic compounds. His electronegativity scale was applied to generating reference information like molecular geometry, s-electron energy, and NMR spin-spin constants for organic compounds.

Electronegativity (Sanderson scale)

References

1912 births
1989 deaths
Inorganic chemists
University of Chicago alumni
20th-century chemists
20th-century American chemists